MI-14 can refer to:
Mil Mi-14, Soviet helicopter

M-14 (Michigan highway)
MI14, British Military Intelligence Section 14